Michael Useem is an American academic. He is the William and Jacalyn Egan Professor of Management at Wharton School of the University of Pennsylvania, where he is also the director of the Center for Leadership and Change Management. He is the author of several books.

Selected works
The Leader’s Checklist
The Leadership Moment 
Investor Capitalism
The Go Point: When It’s Time to Decide
The Edge

References

External links 
 The Best Management Is Less Management a 2018 strategy+business magazine article by Michael Useem and Harbir Singh on management lessons from the Chilean government's response to crisis.

Year of birth missing (living people)
Living people
University of Pennsylvania faculty
Harvard University alumni
University of Michigan alumni